Bahramabad (also Romanized as Bahrāmābād) is a village in Asir Rural District, Asir District, Mohr County, Fars Province, Iran. At the 2006 census, its population was 20, in 4 families.

References 

Populated places in Mohr County